Win Bigly: Persuasion in a World Where Facts Don't Matter is a 2017 nonfiction book by Scott Adams, creator of Dilbert, and author of How To Fail At Everything and Still Win Big. The book presents Adams's theory that Donald Trump's victory in the 2016 United States presidential election was due to Trump being a "master persuader" with a deep understanding of persuasion and the human mind.

In 2015, Adams publicly predicted Trump's victory. Adams later cited his research into the field of persuasion as the basis for his claim. He wrote Win Bigly to analyze Trump's tactics and offer guidance to improve readers' communication skills. He describes people who, like Trump, are skilled at convincing listeners as "master persuaders". He posits that when debating an issue, facts are only important when they can impact at an emotional level.

Reception
Florida Today described the subject matter as "something of great value in today’s media-saturated environment," and Publishers Weekly thought Win Bigly was "highly readable" and handled in a skillful and humorous manner. Politico found the book to be "an oxygen-free cubicle into which is piped a barking infomercial for the president." Win Bigly was a best-seller and brought increased attention to Adams' blog; Michael Schein speculated that Adams exploited Trump's popularity to protect his career as the newspaper industry declines.

See also
 Robert Cialdini § Theory of influence

References

2017 non-fiction books
Books by Scott Adams
Books about persuasion
Portfolio (publisher) books